Ironhead may refer to:

Dale Earnhardt, American race car driver nicknamed "Ironhead"
Craig Heyward, American football player nicknamed "Ironhead"
Ironhead Airport, airport at Sanger, Denton County, Texas, United States
Pandulf Ironhead (died 981), Prince of Benevento and Capua 
Harley-Davidson Ironhead engine, a motorcycle engine produced by Harley-Davidson between 1957 and 1985 
"Iron Head", a song from the Rob Zombie album The Sinister Urge
Ironhead Studio, a costume and art studio that designs many different costumes for American comic book based films.